Kang Chae-rim (born 23 March 1998) is a South Korean footballer who plays as a midfielder for Incheon Red Angels and the South Korea women's national team.

Career
Kang made her international debut for South Korea on 9 April 2019 in a friendly match against Iceland, which finished as a 1–1 draw.

Career statistics

International

International goals
Scores and results list South Korea's goal tally first.

References

External links
 
 
 

1998 births
Living people
South Korean women's footballers
South Korea women's under-17 international footballers
South Korea women's under-20 international footballers
South Korea women's international footballers
Women's association football midfielders
Incheon Hyundai Steel Red Angels WFC players
2019 FIFA Women's World Cup players